The 1963 Nova Scotia general election was held on 8 October 1963 to elect members of the 48th House of Assembly of the Province of Nova Scotia, Canada. It was won by the Progressive Conservatives.

Results

Results by party

Retiring incumbents
Liberal
Pierre E. Belliveau, Clare
John W. MacDonald, Pictou East

Progressive Conservative
George Henry Wilson, Hants West

Nominated candidates
Legend
bold denotes party leader
† denotes an incumbent who is not running for re-election or was defeated in nomination contest

Valley

|-
|bgcolor=whitesmoke|Annapolis East
||
|John I. Marshall2,96256.40%
|
|Melbourne Parker Armstrong2,23242.50%
|
|Murray Alton Bent581.10%
||
|Vacant
|-
|bgcolor=whitesmoke|Annapolis West
|
|Kenneth E. Green2,07545.81%
||
|Peter M. Nicholson2,38652.67%
|
|Dale A. Young691.52%
||
|Peter M. Nicholson
|-
|bgcolor=whitesmoke|Clare
||
|Hector J. Pothier2,15452.61%
|
|Joseph C. LeBlanc1,94047.39%
|
|
||
|Pierre E. Belliveau†
|-
|bgcolor=whitesmoke|Digby
||
|Robert Baden Powell2,67152.23%
|
|Victor Cardoza2,37846.50%
|
|Louis A. Beeler651.27%
||
|Victor Cardoza
|-
|bgcolor=whitesmoke|Hants West
||
|Norman T. Spence4,19358.20%
|
|W. Whitney Spicer2,84039.42%
|
|Arthur Benedict1712.37%
||
|George Henry Wilson†
|-
|bgcolor=whitesmoke|Kings North
||
|Gladys Porter3,66859.43%
|
|David Durell Sutton2,40538.97%
|
|George Turner991.60%
||
|Gladys Porter
|-
|bgcolor=whitesmoke|Kings South
||
|Edward Haliburton2,50565.27%
|
|Bruce M. Trenholm1,33334.73%
|
|
||
|Edward Haliburton
|-
|bgcolor=whitesmoke|Kings West
||
|Paul Kinsman3,87955.85%
|
|Edward D. MacArthur3,06744.15%
|
|
||
|Edward D. MacArthur
|}

South Shore

|-
|bgcolor=whitesmoke|Lunenburg Centre
||
|George O. Lohnes4,78557.06%
|
|Leon J. Iverson3,60142.94%
|
|
||
|George O. Lohnes
|-
|bgcolor=whitesmoke|Lunenburg East
||
|Maurice L. Zinck2,26763.17%
|
|Charles E. Harris1,32236.83%
|
|
||
|Maurice L. Zinck
|-
|bgcolor=whitesmoke|Lunenburg West
||
|Harley J. Spence2,93758.12%
|
|Joye F. Davison2,11641.88%
|
|
||
|Harley J. Spence
|-
|bgcolor=whitesmoke|Queens
||
|W. S. Kennedy Jones3,83365.85%
|
|W. Alton Snow1,98834.15%
|
|
||
|W. S. Kennedy Jones
|-
|bgcolor=whitesmoke|Shelburne
||
|James McKay Harding3,73754.40%
|
|Robert Quinlan Hood3,13345.60%
|
|
||
|James McKay Harding
|-
|rowspan=2 bgcolor=whitesmoke|Yarmouth 
||
|George A. Burridge4,88425.20%
|
|Irving Charles Pink4,34522.42%
|
|Angus Boyd MacGillivary3581.85%
||
|George A. Burridge
|-
||
|George A. Snow5,07726.19%
|
|Willard O'Brien4,71924.35%
|
|
||
|Willard O'Brien
|}

Fundy-Northeast

|-
|rowspan=2 bgcolor=whitesmoke|Colchester
||
|Robert Stanfield9,60632.42%
|
|Gordon T. Purdy5,51518.61%
|
|Harvey T. Curtis3821.29%
||
|Robert Stanfield
|-
||
|George Isaac Smith9,14730.87%
|
|Charles K. Sutherland4,74616.02%
|
|Helen K. Wright2330.79%
||
|George Isaac Smith
|-
|bgcolor=whitesmoke|Cumberland Centre
||
|Stephen T. Pyke2,54566.68%
|
|William Thomas Noiles1,27233.32%
|
|
||
|Stephen T. Pyke
|-
|bgcolor=whitesmoke|Cumberland East
||
|James A. Langille5,22663.10%
|
|Norman Willard Noonan2,79533.75%
|
|Lloyd L. Ayer2613.15%
||
|James A. Langille
|-
|bgcolor=whitesmoke|Cumberland West
||
|D. L. George Henley2,51654.04%
|
|Allison T. Smith2,14045.96%
|
|
||
|Allison T. Smith
|-
|bgcolor=whitesmoke|Hants East
||
|Albert J. Ettinger2,73952.86%
|
|George E. Fraser2,35645.47%
|
|Ralph Loomer871.68%
||
|Albert J. Ettinger
|}

Halifax/Dartmouth/Eastern Shore

|-
|bgcolor=whitesmoke|Halifax Centre
||
|Donald MacKeen Smith5,47858.57%
|
|Gordon S. Cowan3,87541.43%
|
|
||
|Donald MacKeen Smith
|-
|bgcolor=whitesmoke|Halifax County-Dartmouth
||
|Irvin William Akerley9,88452.88%
|
|Gordon L. S. Hart8,15043.60%
|
|Edward B. Doyle6573.52%
||
|Gordon L. S. Hart
|-
|bgcolor=whitesmoke|Halifax East
||
|Nelson Gaetz3,06152.62%
|
|Duncan MacMillan2,75647.38%
|
|
||
|Duncan MacMillan
|-
|bgcolor=whitesmoke|Halifax North
||
|James H. Vaughan8,60252.43%
|
|John E. Ahern7,36044.86%
|
|Peggy Prowse4442.71%
||
|John E. Ahern
|-
|bgcolor=whitesmoke|Halifax Northwest
||
|Gordon H. Fitzgerald5,55956.07%
|
|George Douglas Burris4,02740.62%
|
|Gerald A. Guptill3293.32%
||
|Gordon H. Fitzgerald
|-
|bgcolor=whitesmoke|Halifax South
||
|Richard Donahoe5,98663.23%
|
|Merlin Nunn3,18333.62%
|
|Gordon A. Smith2983.15%
||
|Richard Donahoe
|-
|bgcolor=whitesmoke|Halifax West
||
|D. C. McNeil8,79257.00%
|
|Charles H. Reardon6,12639.72%
|
|Harold J. Martell5063.28%
||
|Charles H. Reardon
|}

Central Nova

|-
|bgcolor=whitesmoke|Antigonish 
||
|William F. MacKinnon3,33454.58%
|
|Ronald Saint John Chisholm2,77445.42%
|
|
||
|William F. MacKinnon
|-
|bgcolor=whitesmoke|Guysborough
||
|Alexander MacIsaac3,22952.86%
|
|Thomas Edwin Kirk2,88047.14%
|
|
||
|Alexander MacIsaac
|-
|bgcolor=whitesmoke|Pictou Centre
||
|Donald R. MacLeod5,75260.21%
|
|Thomas H. Frazer3,80139.79%
|
|
||
|Donald R. MacLeod
|-
|bgcolor=whitesmoke|Pictou East
|
|John Andrew McLean2,64949.90%
||
|A. Lloyd MacDonald2,66050.10%
|
|
||
|John W. MacDonald†
|-
|bgcolor=whitesmoke|Pictou West
||
|Harvey Veniot2,99959.54%
|
|Charles Ernest MacCarthy2,03840.46%
|
|
||
|Harvey Veniot
|}

Cape Breton

|-
|bgcolor=whitesmoke|Cape Breton Centre
||
|Mike Laffin3,69954.12%
|
|Joseph Flaudio Rizzetto93913.74%
|
|Michael James MacDonald2,19732.14%
||
|Michael James MacDonald
|-
|bgcolor=whitesmoke|Cape Breton East
||
|Layton Fergusson5,87058.06%
|
|Bernard Currie1,35913.44%
|
|John L. MacKinnon2,88128.50%
||
|Layton Fergusson
|-
|bgcolor=whitesmoke|Cape Breton North
||
|Tom MacKeough6,20058.71%
|
|Murray J. Ryan2,96128.04%
|
|John Dolhanty1,39913.25%
||
|Tom MacKeough
|-
|bgcolor=whitesmoke|Cape Breton Nova
||
|Percy Gaum3,34453.37%
|
|Charles Richard Sigut1,21319.36%
|
|Albert Ollie Wilson1,70927.27%
||
|Percy Gaum
|-
|bgcolor=whitesmoke|Cape Breton South
||
|Donald C. MacNeil5,28349.21%
|
|John F. MacIntosh3,57933.34%
|
|Edward Johnston1,87317.45%
||
|Donald C. MacNeil
|-
|bgcolor=whitesmoke|Cape Breton West
||
|Edward Manson4,94156.30%
|
|Allan Sullivan3,83543.70%
|
|
||
|Edward Manson
|-
|rowspan=2 bgcolor=whitesmoke|Inverness
||
|Norman J. MacLean4,47426.78%
|
|Joseph Clyde Nunn3,98823.87%
|
|
||
|Joseph Clyde Nunn
|-
|
|Alfred J. Davis4,02624.10%
||
|William N. MacLean4,21925.25%
|
|
||
|William N. MacLean
|-
|bgcolor=whitesmoke|Richmond
||
|Gerald Doucet2,67050.79%
|
|Earl Wallace Urquhart2,58749.21%
|
|
||
|Earl Wallace Urquhart
|-
|bgcolor=whitesmoke|Victoria
|
|Fisher Hudson1,89049.42%
||
|Carleton L. MacMillan1,93450.58%
|
|
||
|Carleton L. MacMillan
|}

References

Further reading
 

1963
Nova Scotia general election
General election
Nova Scotia general election